The Applebay Zia is an American, single-seat, high-wing, twin-boom, pusher configuration motor glider that was designed by George Applebay for the 1982 Sailplane Homebuilders Association Homebuilt Sailplane Design Contest. The aircraft was intended to be offered as a factory completed aircraft or as a kit. It first flew in 1982.

Design and development
Even though the Zia was designed for the 1982 Sailplane Homebuilders Association Homebuilt Sailplane Design Contest, it was withdrawn from the competition as it required changes during the contest period, which the rules prohibited. In fact the design that was to become the Zia went through six different configurations, starting as a canard. The aircraft is named for the Zia people.

The Zia is constructed from fiberglass  with a carbon fiber wing spar. The aircraft has fixed tricycle gear featuring wheel pants. The specified engine is the  Rotax 277 two-stroke, which is started with a manual recoil starter. The aircraft has flaps which deploy to 45° and retract anytime the flap handle is released, intentionally preventing the use of flaps and throttle at the same time. Fuel is  carried in the left wing root tank.

The Zia was placed in series production in the fall of 1983 but only four were completed, including the prototype. The design was not type certified and all examples produced were registered in the Experimental category

Operational history
In March 2011 there were still two Zias registered in the US, including one owned by the designer.

Aircraft on display
US Southwest Soaring Museum

Specifications (Zia)

See also

References

1980s United States sailplanes
Zia
Aircraft first flown in 1982
Twin-boom aircraft
Motor gliders
Single-engined pusher aircraft